Van Beek is a toponymic surname of (southern) Dutch origin. Though translating as "of the stream", the absence of an article suggests that the original bearer originated from a town called Beek rather than lived near a stream. There are several towns which are or were named Beek in Gelderland, Limburg and North Brabant and also one in the municipality Bree in Belgium near the Dutch border. The name is quite common in the Netherlands, ranking 38th in 2007 (17,148 people). Related names include Beek, Van Beeck,  Ter Beek, Van der Beek, and Verbeek. People with this surname include:

Arie van Beek (b. 1951), Dutch conductor
Bernard van Beek (1875–1941), Dutch landscape painter
Gijs van Beek (born 1971), Dutch sport shooter
Gys van Beek (1919–2015), Dutch resistance member and American inventor  
Harold van Beek (b. 1962), Dutch racewalker
Jackie van Beek, New Zealand film director, writer and actress
Jan van Beek (1880–1954), Dutch footballer
Logan van Beek (b. 1990), New Zealand-born Dutch cricketer
Lotte van Beek (b. 1991), Dutch speed skater
Martin van Beek (b. 1960), Dutch politician
Rinus van Beek (b. 1947), Dutch swimmer
Rob Van Beek (b. 1983), Canadian lacrosse player
Sven van Beek (b. 1994), Dutch footballer
Svenja van Beek (b. 1987), Dutch pop singer
Willibrord van Beek (b. 1949), Dutch politician
Bontjes van Beek
Cato Bontjes van Beek (1920–1943), German resistance member

Van Beeck
Franz Jozef van Beeck (1930–2011), Dutch Jesuit theologian

Von Beeck
Peter von Beeck (died 1624), German (Aachen) historian

See also
 Beek (disambiguation)
 Van der Beek, Dutch surname

References

Dutch-language surnames
Surnames of Dutch origin